Jimmy Knowles (born 25 January 2002) is an English professional footballer who plays as a forward for Mansfield Town.

Career
Knowles was called up to the Mansfield Town senior team by manager David Flitcroft after he scored four goals in a reserve game against Port Vale in March 2019. He signed a two-year professional contract with the "Stags" three months later. Manager John Dempster gave Knowles his debut in the English Football League in a 0–0 draw with Stevenage at Field Mill on 24 August, putting him on as an 89th-minute substitute for Alex MacDonald. He scored his first goal for the club in an EFL Trophy tie against Crewe Alexandra on 8 October 2019.

He was loaned to Notts County in September 2020. On 5 April 2021 Knowles scored his first senior hat-trick during a 4–2 win in a Vanarama National League fixture at Woking, scoring in the 60th, 66th & 79th minutes.

Knowles was loaned to Scottish Championship club Greenock Morton in August 2021.

Style of play
The Mansfield Town club website described Knowles as a forward with "great work ethic, possesses bags of pace and has an eye for goal".

Career statistics

References

2002 births
Living people
Footballers from Sutton, London
English footballers
Association football forwards
Mansfield Town F.C. players
Notts County F.C. players
English Football League players
Greenock Morton F.C. players
Scottish Professional Football League players
National League (English football) players